Akupu (also known as Palehua) is a populated place in Honolulu County, Hawaii, United States.

References

Populated places on Oahu